Alina Anatolyivna Shukh (born 12 February 1999) is a Ukrainian heptathlete. She competed in the women's heptathlon at the 2017 World Championships in Athletics.

References

External links
 

1999 births
Living people
Ukrainian heptathletes
World Athletics Championships athletes for Ukraine
Place of birth missing (living people)
Ukrainian female javelin throwers
World Athletics U20 Championships winners
21st-century Ukrainian women